Araceli or Aracely, a Spanish female name from Latin Ara Caeli, "the altar in heaven", may refer to:

Politicians
 Aracely Leuquén Uribe, a Chilean politician
Araceli Velazquez, a Mexican politician
 Araceli Torres Flores, a Mexican politician

Athletes
 Araceli Castro, a Mexican athlete
 Araceli Navarro, a Spanish fencer
 Araceli Segarra, a Spanish climber

Artists/Entertainers
 Araceli González, Argentine model, actress and TV host
 Araceli Gilbert, Ecuadorian artist
 Araceli "Arly" Jover, Spanish actress
 Araceli Aipoh, Filipino-Nigerian writer
 Araceli Ardón, Mexican writer
 Aracely Arámbula, Mexican actress, model and singer

Variations
 Ara Celi, an American actress

Other
 Araceli, Palawan, a Philippine municipality

See also
Santa Maria in Araceli (Vicenza)

Spanish feminine given names